Jesca Ababiku (born 17 July 1975) is a Ugandan educator and politician. She is currently a member of the Tenth Parliament of Uganda, representing the people of Adjumani district in one of the parliamentary seats reserved for women. She is a member of the National Resistance Movement (NRM), the ruling political party in Uganda under the chairmanship of Yoweri Kaguta Museveni Tibuhaburwa, the current president of the Republic of Uganda (as of 2021). In the 2021 Uganda general elections, Ababiku retained her seat as women member of parliament for Adjumani district.

Early life and education 
Ababiku was born on the 17th of July 1945. She grew up in Adjumani district. She attended Adjumani Girls Primary School, graduating in 1990 with her Primary Leaving Examination. In 1994 she obtained her Uganda Certificate of Education from Metu Secondary School, in 1997 she obtained her Uganda Advanced Certificate of Education from Moyo Secondary School in Moyo Town, and in 1999 she graduated from the Muni National Teachers College with a Diploma in Education. In 2006, she obtained a bachelor's degree in Education from Makerere University, and later on in 2013, she graduated from Gulu University with a master's degree in education.

Work experience 
Ababiku became a teacher shortly after graduating from the Muni National Teachers College. In 2000, she started teaching at Alere Secondary School, a government-aided school in the Adropi sub-county of the Adjumani District which was established in 1991 as a boarding school to assist refugee children, primarily from South Sudan.

In 2002, she became a Teachers Representative to the Board of Governors of Alere Secondary School, a position she held till 2004, and acted as class teacher and head of the history department from 2004 to 2006. She additionally became a District Councillor in the Adjumani District local government from 2002 to 2010 and was a Council Member of Kyambogo University from 2004 to 2010. She was Secretary of Production for the Adjumani District Local Government from 2004 to 2006, and from 2006 to 2010 she was council member of the national union of disabled persons of Uganda.  Earlier in 2002 she had assumed the chairmanship of Adjumani disabled persons association, a position she held till 2010.

Political career 
In 2010, she retired from being a teacher, from being a District Councillor for the Adjumani District Local Government, and from her roles with the National Union of Disabled Persons of Uganda and the Adjumani Disabled Persons Association to run for Parliament of Uganda. She ran as an independent (although she later became a member of the National Resistance Movement) for the District Woman Representative for the Adjumani District and won. She received 17,037 votes to win the four-way race for the seat.

In parliament, Ababiku is a member of the Public Accounts Committee and the Committee on Presidential Affairs. She is also a member of the Uganda Women Parliamentary Association (UWOPA), where she is a member of the Employment Act/Economic empowerment round table committee that is chaired by Agnes Kunihira.

Personal life 
Jesca Ababiku is single. Her hobbies include listening to music and reading.

See also 

 List of members of the eleventh Parliament of Uganda
 Moses Ali
 Adjumani District

External links 

 Website of the Parliament of Uganda.

References 

1975 births
Living people
Gulu University alumni
Makerere University alumni
National Resistance Movement politicians
Ugandan educators
Members of the Parliament of Uganda
Women members of the Parliament of Uganda
21st-century Ugandan politicians
21st-century Ugandan women politicians